Isle Haute is an island in the upper regions of Bay of Fundy in Nova Scotia, near the entrance to the Minas Basin. It is 16 kilometers from Harbourville and eight kilometers south-southwest of Cape Chignecto. The island is part of Cumberland County, Nova Scotia and is three kilometres (1.9 mi) long and 400 metres (1,300 ft) wide. The Mi'kmaq used the island to make stone tools before Europeans arrived and called the island "Maskusetik", meaning place of wild potatoes. In 1604, Samuel de Champlain gave the present name to the island, which means "High Island" in French, when he observed the  towering bluffs, timber and fresh-water springs. The steep  basalt cliffs of the island are the result from volcanic eruptions in the Jurassic period and may have been connected to the North Mountain volcanic ridge on the mainland 200 million years ago, before the Bay of Fundy was formed.

In 1878, a lighthouse was built and was staffed until 1956, when fire collapsed the lighthouse and home of the lighthouse keeper. The lighthouse was replaced by a steel tower and is unstaffed. Federally owned, the island is being transferred from the Canadian Coast Guard to the Canadian Wildlife Service to protect its unique ecosystem. The island is also protected under Nova Scotia's Special Places Act to protect early Mi'kmaq archaeological sites. Digging without an archaeological permit or removal of artifacts is prohibited.

See also
Basalt Headlands
Volcanology of Canada
Volcanology of Eastern Canada

References

Sara Keddy, "Isle Haute captures scientists' imaginations", Berwick Register, July 23, 1997
 Anne Ottow "The-mysteries-of-Isle-Haute", Annapolis County Spectator, October 9, 2007
"Isle Haute Lighthouse", Nova Scotia Lighthouse Preservation Society website
Isle Haute, Bay of Fundy, Nova Scotia, video
Dan Conlin, "Industrial History of Isle Haute", Industrial Heritage of Nova Scotia

Islands of Nova Scotia
Landforms of Cumberland County, Nova Scotia
General Service Areas in Nova Scotia
Volcanism of Nova Scotia